The women's 400 metres at the 2018 European Athletics Championships takes place at the Olympic Stadium on 8, 9 and 11 August.

Records

Schedule

Results

Round 1

First 2 in each heat (Q) and the next fastest 6 (q) advanced to the Semifinals.

Semifinals
First 2 (Q) and next 2 fastest (q) qualify for the final.

*Athletes who received a bye to the semifinals

Final

References

400 W
400 metres at the European Athletics Championships
Euro